Broxburn is a rural locality in the Toowoomba Region, Queensland, Australia. In the  Broxburn had a population of 153 people.

Geography 
The northwest boundary follows the Gore Highway.  Close to the northern boundary is the Millmerran railway line with now-abandoned Greenhills railway station formerly serving the locality.

The land use is a mixture of crop growing and grazing on native vegetation.

History 
The Broxburn Provisional School opened on 13 June 1898. In 1909, it became Broxburn State School. It closed in 1959. It was on the Pittsworth Felton Road, now just within the boundaries of Pittsworth.

Wilga View State School opened on 4 July 1938 and closed in 1959.

In the  Broxburn had a population of 153 people.

Economy
There are a number of homesteads in the locality, including:

 Albion Park
 Dalhiem Park
 East Lynne
 Glenhaven
 Greystones
 Helgar Park
 Highland View
 Hulilou
 Nevertire
 Peppertree
 Rockmount
 Rogar Park
 Tullawood

Education
There are no schools in Broxburn. The nearest government primary schools are Pittsworth State School in neighbouring Pittsworth to the west and Southbrook Central State School in neighbouring Southbrook to the north-east. The nearest government secondary school is Pittsworth State High School in Pittsworth.

References

Toowoomba Region
Localities in Queensland